Ross Davidson (born 11 November 1973 in Chertsey, England) is an English former professional footballer who played as a defender for Sheffield United, Chester City and Shrewsbury Town in the Football League.

Career
Davidson was signed for Sheffield United by manager Dave Bassett in June 1993 from non-league Walton and Hersham. He was never able to make the break into the first team and was eventually given a free transfer to Chester City in 1996. He made over 100 appearances for The Blues before spells with Barnet and Shrewsbury Town where he finished his career. At Shrewsbury he scored once, his goal coming in the League Cup against Preston North End.

References

External links

1973 births
Living people
Sportspeople from Chertsey
Association football defenders
English Football League players
Sheffield United F.C. players
Chester City F.C. players
Barnet F.C. players
Shrewsbury Town F.C. players
English footballers